Jordy van der Winden (born 4 March 1994) is a Dutch professional footballer who plays as a left-back for Eerste Divisie club FC Den Bosch.

References

External links
 
 Career stats & Profile - Voetbal International

1994 births
Living people
Dutch footballers
FC Utrecht players
FC Den Bosch players
Eredivisie players
Eerste Divisie players
People from Spijkenisse
Association football defenders
VV Spijkenisse players
Footballers from South Holland